Dohrn's warbler (Sylvia dohrni), also known as Principe flycatcher-babbler, Dohrn's flycatcher, Dohrn's thrush-babbler, is a species of passerine bird in the family Sylviidae that is endemic to the island of Príncipe which lies off the west coast of Africa in the Gulf of Guinea.

Formerly placed within the genus Horizorhinus, it is now placed in the genus Sylvia based on the results of molecular phylogenetic studies.
The specific name honours Heinrich Wolfgang Ludwig Dohrn.

References

Dohrn's warbler
Endemic birds of São Tomé and Príncipe
Endemic fauna of Príncipe
Dohrn's warbler
Taxonomy articles created by Polbot